Tropidia incana is a species of hoverfly in the family Syrphidae.

Distribution
United States.

References

Eristalinae
Diptera of North America
Hoverflies of North America
Taxa named by Charles Henry Tyler Townsend
Insects described in 1895